Pancho is a nickname, forename, and surname.

Pancho may also refer to:

 Los Panchos, a Latin pop trio
 Pancho's Mexican Buffet, a restaurant chain
 Pancho Lake, Idaho
 Pancho Aréna, a stadium, primarily for football, in Felcsút, Hungary

See also
 Pancha (disambiguation)